Al Qadimah (Arabic: القضيمة) is a village in Makkah Province, on the western coast of Saudi Arabia.

It is 94 kilometers north of Jeddah. Along with Thual, it hosts the new economic city project, King Abdullah University of Science and Technology (KAUST).

Al Qadimah's coast faces several islands which belong to King Fahd's private properties.

See also 

 List of cities and towns in Saudi Arabia
 Regions of Saudi Arabia

References

Populated places in Mecca Province